Barbara Wertheim Tuchman (January 30, 1912 – February 6, 1989) was an American historian and author. She won the Pulitzer Prize twice, for The Guns of August (1962), a best-selling history of the prelude to and the first month of World War I, and Stilwell and the American Experience in China (1971), a biography of General Joseph Stilwell.

Tuchman focused on writing popular history.

Early years
Barbara Wertheim was born January 30, 1912, the daughter of the banker Maurice Wertheim and his first wife Alma Morgenthau. Her father was an individual of wealth and prestige, the owner of The Nation magazine, president of the American Jewish Committee, prominent art collector, and a founder of the Theatre Guild. Her mother was the daughter of Henry Morgenthau, Woodrow Wilson's ambassador to the Ottoman Empire.

While she did not explicitly mention it in her book The Guns of August, Tuchman was present for one of the pivotal events of the book: the pursuit of the German battle cruiser Goeben and light cruiser Breslau. In her account of the pursuit she wrote, "That morning [August 10, 1914] there arrived in Constantinople the small Italian passenger steamer which had witnessed the Gloucester'''s action against Goeben and Breslau. Among its passengers were the daughter, son-in-law and three grandchildren of the American ambassador Mr. Henry Morgenthau." As she was a grandchild of Henry Morgenthau, she is referring to herself, which is confirmed in her later book Practicing History, in which she tells the story of her father, Maurice Wertheim, traveling from Constantinople to Jerusalem on August 29, 1914, to deliver funds to the Jewish community there. Thus, at two, Tuchman was present during the pursuit of Goeben and Breslau, which she documented 48 years later.

Wertheim was influenced at an early age by the books of Lucy Fitch Perkins and G. A. Henty, as well as the historical novels of Alexandre Dumas. She attended the Walden School on Manhattan's Upper West Side. She received her Bachelor of Arts from Radcliffe College in 1933, having studied history and literature.

Researcher and journalist

Following graduation, Wertheim worked as a volunteer research assistant at the Institute of Pacific Relations in New York, spending a year in Tokyo in 1934–35, including a month in China, then returning to the United States via the Trans-Siberian Railway to Moscow and on to Paris. She also contributed to The Nation as a correspondent until her father's sale of the publication in 1937, traveling to Valencia and Madrid to cover the Spanish Civil War. A first book resulted from her Spanish experience, The Lost British Policy: Britain and Spain Since 1700, published in 1938.

In 1940 Wertheim married Lester R. Tuchman, an internist, medical researcher and professor of clinical medicine at Mount Sinai School of Medicine in Manhattan. They had three daughters, including Jessica Mathews, who became president of the Carnegie Endowment for International Peace.

During the years of World War II, Tuchman worked in the Office of War Information. Following the war, Tuchman spent the next decade working to raise the children while doing basic research for what would ultimately become the 1956 book Bible and Sword: England and Palestine from the Bronze Age to Balfour.Historian
With the publication of Bible and Sword in 1956, Tuchman dedicated herself to historical research and writing, turning out a new book approximately every four years. Rather than feeling hampered by the lack of an advanced degree in history, Tuchman argued that freedom from the rigors and expectations of academia was actually liberating, as the norms of academic writing would have "stifled any writing capacity."

Tuchman favored a literary approach to the writing of history, providing eloquent explanatory narratives rather than concentration upon discovery and publication of fresh archival sources. In the words of one biographer, Tuchman was "not a historian's historian; she was a layperson's historian who made the past interesting to millions of readers". Tuchman's storytelling prowess was rewarded in 1963 when she received the Pulitzer Prize for her book The Guns of August, dealing with the behind-the-scenes political machinations which led to the eruption of World War I in the summer of 1914.

In 1971, Tuchman received the St. Louis Literary Award from the Saint Louis University Library Associates.

Tuchman received a second Pulitzer in 1972 for her biography of Joseph Stilwell, Stilwell and the American Experience in China.In 1978, Tuchman was elected a Fellow of the American Academy of Arts and Sciences. She became the first female president of the American Academy of Arts and Letters in 1979. She won a U.S. National Book Award in History for the first paperback edition of A Distant Mirror in 1980. Also in 1980 Tuchman gave the National Endowment for the Humanities' (NEH) Jefferson Lecture, the U.S. federal government's highest honor for achievement in the humanities. Tuchman's lecture was titled "Mankind's Better Moments".

Tuchman was a trustee of Radcliffe College and a lecturer at Harvard, the University of California, and the Naval War College. Although she never received a formal graduate degree in history, Tuchman was the recipient of a number of honorary degrees from leading American universities, including Yale University, Harvard University, New York University, Columbia University, Boston University, and Smith College, among others.

Death and legacy
Tuchman died in 1989 in Greenwich, Connecticut, following a stroke, at age 77.

A tower of Currier House, a residential division first of Radcliffe College and now of Harvard College, was named in Tuchman's honor.

The Historical International Relations Section of the International Studies Association has named a prize in Tuchman's honor, the "Barbara W. Tuchman Prize for Best Paper in Historical International Relations by a Graduate Student".

Tuchman's Law

In the introduction to her 1978 book A Distant Mirror, Tuchman playfully identified a historical phenomenon which she termed "Tuchman's Law", to wit:

Tuchman's Law has been defined as a psychological principle of "perceptual readiness" or "subjective probability".

Bibliography

Books
 The Lost British Policy: Britain and Spain Since 1700. London: United Editorial, 1938. 
 Bible and Sword: England and Palestine from the Bronze Age to Balfour. New York: New York University Press, 1956. 
 The Zimmermann Telegram: America Enters The War, 1917 - 1918. New York: Viking Press, 1958.  online
 The Guns of August. New York: Macmillan, 1962. 
 The Proud Tower: A Portrait of the World before the War, 1890–1914. New York: Macmillan, 1966. 
 Stilwell and the American Experience in China, 1911–45 (1971) 
 Notes from China. New York: Collier, 1972. 
 A Distant Mirror: The Calamitous Fourteenth Century. New York: Alfred A. Knopf, 1978. 
 Practicing History: Selected Essays. New York: Alfred A. Knopf, 1981. 
 The March of Folly: From Troy to Vietnam. New York: Knopf/Random House, 1984. 
 The First Salute: A View of the American Revolution. New York: Knopf/Random House, 1988. 

Other works
 America's Security in the 1980s. London: International Institute for Strategic Studies, 1982.
 The Book: A Lecture Sponsored by the Center for the Book in the Library of Congress and the Authors’ League of America, Presented at the Library of Congress, October 17, 1979.'' Washington, DC: Library of Congress, 1980.

References

External links
 Barbara Wertheim Tuchman papers (MS 574). Manuscripts and Archives, Yale University Library. 

 TV interview with Bill Moyers September 30, 1988
 
 Author's entry on The MacDowell Colony
 Biography on The Jewish Virtual Library
 Bibliographical list on GoogleBooks
 Entry on ''Distinguished Women
 
 Historical International Relations Section
 Barbara W. Tuchman Prize for Best Paper in Historical International Relations by a Graduate Student

1912 births
1989 deaths
American military writers
American people of German-Jewish descent
Historians of the United States
Jewish American historians
Morgenthau family
National Book Award winners
Pulitzer Prize for General Non-Fiction winners
Radcliffe College alumni
Historians of World War I
20th-century American historians
20th-century American women writers
American people of the Spanish Civil War
American women journalists
American women historians
Fellows of the American Academy of Arts and Sciences
Women in war in Spain
Women war correspondents
Women military writers
20th-century American biographers
American women biographers
Trustees of educational establishments
Walden School (New York City) alumni
People of the United States Office of War Information
American women civilians in World War II
Wertheim family
Presidents of the American Academy of Arts and Letters
20th-century American Jews